Ailly-sur-Somme is a railway station located in the commune of Ailly-sur-Somme in the Somme department, France. The station is served by TER Hauts-de-France trains (Abbeville - Amiens - Albert line).

See also
List of SNCF stations in Hauts-de-France

References

Railway stations in Somme (department)
Railway stations in France opened in 1847